Seenu is a 2000 Indian Tamil-language musical drama film directed by P. Vasu. It stars Karthik and Malavika. The movie is a remake of 1991 Malayalam movie Bharatham.

Plot
Kesavan (P. Vasu) is a famous Carnatic singer who performs concerts. He lives with his family, consisting of his wife and son. Seenu (Karthik) is his younger brother who leads a joyful life. Seenu is very much fond of Kesavan and could not tolerate anyone speaking ill about him. Unfortunately, Kesavan develops a habit of consuming alcohol, which is only known to his wife.  Kesavan's wife tries hard to stop him from consuming alcohol, but all her efforts go in vain. She does not reveal this to her family members. Seenu falls in love with his relative (Malavika). When the family members come to know about Kesavan's habit of drinking, they advise him to stop it as it will bring down the fame what he has earned so far. Kesavan does not listen to them and gets angry if someone starts advising him to stop drinking.

Slowly, Kesavan's habit of consuming alcohol increases, and one day he goes to a concert after drinking and stumbles on stage. Seenu is shocked to see this and rushes to the stage. Also to calm down the crowd, Seenu starts singing in place of Kesavan in the concert. To everyone's surprise, Seenu's singing ability is great, and he is appreciated by everyone. Seenu feels happy seeing this, but on the other hand, he worries as he is thinking about his brother's condition. Seenu's image increases among people, and he starts performing in concerts. Although Kesavan feels happy seeing his brother grow well, he develops an ego within him, thinking that Seenu will overpower him. This makes Kesavan behave rude towards his family members, especially Seenu, and also descend into alcoholism. Kesavan feels embarrassed when people start approaching Seenu for concerts instead of him. Above this, Seenu gets an opportunity to sing in Thiagaraja Aradhanai, which further angers Kesavan.

However, Seenu understands the reason behind Kesavan's behavior and decides to stop performing on stage. Seenu also meets Kesavan and explains how much he respects him and makes his point clear that overpowering Kesavan was never his aim. Kesavan feels bad hearing Seenu's emotional conversation and realizes his mistake. Kesavan and Seenu also have a sister whose wedding is fixed. The entire family gets back to happy mode on the event of the wedding. Kesavan is also recovered and decides to go on a pilgrimage trip before his sister's wedding so that he could return pure. On the day before their sister's wedding, Seenu gets the information that Kesavan has met with an accident while he was on the pilgrimage trip and has died. Seenu is shocked but does not reveal this to his family members as it would stop his sister's wedding. Seenu rushes to the hospital to confirm the news and finds it to be Kesavan. He hides the information and instead attends his sister's wedding. Seenu informs that Kesavan could not make to the wedding as he was busy in a temple. Once the wedding is completed, Seenu reveals the truth, which shocks the entire family. Seenu later becomes a famous Carnatic singer, and the legacy continues, but he attributes all his success to Kesavan.

Cast
 Karthik as Seenu
 Malavika as Geetha
 P. Vasu as Kesavan
 Vivek as Palanisamy
 Janagaraj as Mani
 Thyagu as Seenu's uncle
 Kaka Radhakrishnan as Seenu's grandfather
 Thalaivasal Vijay as Seenu's uncle
 Sathyapriya as Seetha, Seenu's mother
 Sabitha Anand as Janaki
 Ennathe Kannaiah as Servant
 Thalapathy Dinesh as Police inspector
 Crane Manohar as Groom
 Mayilsamy as Troupe song leader

Production
The film initially developed under the title Thambikku Oru Paattu and then Poojai, before the name of the lead character was finalised as the title.

Soundtrack

Soundtrack was composed by Deva. Lyrics were written by Vaali.
 "Dey Nandakumara" - Unnikrishnan, Chitra
 "Kuchalaambaal" - Unni Menon, Harini
 "Madhava Sethumadhava" - Hariharan
 "Paadukiran Oru Paattu" - Unnikrishnan
 "Vanakkam" - Hariharan

Release
A critic from the entertainment portal Tamilet noted "The knot is taken from a Malayalam film. But somewhere along the way, the intensity and the emotional impact of the original is lost."

References

2000 films
Tamil remakes of Malayalam films
2000s Tamil-language films
Indian drama films
Films about classical music and musicians
Films directed by P. Vasu
Films scored by Deva (composer)
2000 drama films